Marvin Wilfredo Monterroza Delzas (born 1 March 1991) is a Salvadoran professional footballer who plays as a midfielder for Primera División club Alianza and the El Salvador national team.

Club career
Monterroza was part of the Isidro Metapán squad since the Clausura 2011 tournament. With the team of Santa Ana Monterroza won many national league titles: Clausura 2012, Apertura 2013, Clausura 2014, Apertura 2014, but he also reaped a bitter defeat in the final of the Clausura 2015 losing that match against Santa Tecla.

Subsequently, Monterroza signed with Alianza at the Apertura 2017 tournament. With the team of San Salvador he won two national league titles: Apertura 2017 and Clausura 2018. Monterroza was decisive for having scored in the finals of both tournaments, also he was even chosen as the best player of the Clausura 2018 final on penalties.

International career
Monterroza made his debut for the El Salvador national team in 2014. Monterroza was called by coach Albert Roca to the team that competed in the Copa Centroamericana of the same year. The Salvadoran team achieved a fourth place in the tournament.

Honors
Isidro Metapán
 Primera División: Apertura 2012, Apertura 2013, Apertura 2014, Clausura 2014

Alianza
 Primera División: Apertura 2017, Clausura 2018

References

External links
 
 
 

1991 births
Living people
Salvadoran footballers
People from Santa Ana Department
Association football midfielders
A.D. Isidro Metapán footballers
Alianza F.C. footballers
Salvadoran Primera División players
El Salvador international footballers
2014 Copa Centroamericana players
2019 CONCACAF Gold Cup players
2021 CONCACAF Gold Cup players